Svetoslav Stoyanov (born 10 July 1976) is a male badminton player originally from Bulgaria, but later competed for France.

Stoyanov competed in badminton at the 2004 Summer Olympics in mixed doubles with partner Victoria Wright.  They lost to Jens Eriksen and Mette Schjoldager of Denmark in the round of 32.

He won the bronze medal at the 2008 European Badminton Championships in men's doubles with Erwin Kehlhoffner.

References

1976 births
Living people
Badminton players at the 2000 Summer Olympics
Badminton players at the 2004 Summer Olympics
French male badminton players
Olympic badminton players of France
Olympic badminton players of Bulgaria
Bulgarian male badminton players